Turbhe railway station is on the Harbour Line of the Mumbai Suburban Railway network near Mumbai, Maharashtra, India. It is a junction station and is located in the node of Turbhe. The station is accessible from the Thane–Belapur road on the eastern side and the NMMT depot on the western side.

Turbhe is the fifth railway station on the Thane-Turbhe-Vashi/Nerul Rail Corridor, a 23-km-long corridor connecting Thane with Navi Mumbai. It is at a distance of 15 km from Thane railway station and 3 km from Vashi railway station. The station has been designed by Hafeez Contractor. Like other stations on this corridor, Turbhe has double discharge facilities on all tracks with a width of 12 m for island platforms and 8 m for end platforms. The station occupies an area of 15,000 square metres and has a parking capacity for 175 cars and 250 motorcycles.

As of 2005, there were twelve services a day on this rail line in either direction. Currently, there are 88 services on either side from Vashi and Thane.

References

Railway stations in Thane district
Mumbai Suburban Railway stations
Mumbai CR railway division